The 1989–90 Courage Area League South was the third full season of rugby union within the fourth tier of the English league system, currently known as National League 2 South, and counterpart to Courage Area League North (now known as National League 2 North.  It would be the last season the division would be known as Area League South and would be renamed as National 4 South the following year.  Metropolitan Police won the championship winning nine of their ten league matches and were promoted to the 1990–91 National Division Three. Clifton (also promoted) came second, one point behind, and were the only team to defeat the champions. Only one team, Salisbury was relegated and they will play in South West Division One next season.

Structure
Each team played one match against each of the other teams, playing a total of ten matches each. The champions are promoted to National Division 3 and the bottom team are relegated to either London Division One or South West One depending on their locality.

Participating teams and locations

League table

Sponsorship
Area League South is part of the Courage Clubs Championship and is sponsored by Courage Brewery.

References

N4
National League 2 South